The following is a list of mayors and equivalent officials of the city of Oran, Algeria.

Royal commissioners, 1832–48 
 Pujol, 1832
 Pierre François Xavier Boyer, circa 1832
 Pascal de Lesseps, circa 1834
 Marius Jonquier, circa 1848

Mayors, 1849–1962 
 Jean-Félix Renaud-Lebon, 1849
 David, 1850
 André Freixe, 1852
 Cauquil, 1855
 Armand Marion, 1861
 , 1862
 Joseph Decugis, 1866
 Choupot, 1867
 Théodore Garbé, 1867
 Renault, 1868
 Joseph Andrieu, 1870
 Marie Prosper Eugène Gradwohl
 Achille Bariat, 1872
 Alexandre Cauquil, 1877
 Floréal Mathieu, 1878 
 Louis Rey, 1882–1883
 Pierre Ayme, 1884
 Floréal Mathieu, 1886
 Floréal Mathieu, 1892
 Laurent Fouques, 1896
 , 1901
 Arthur Gobert, 1902
 Hippolyte Giraud, 1905–1907
 Eugène Colombani, 1907
 Colombani, 1912
 , 1912
 Antoine Béranger, 1921
 Jules Molle, 1921–1931
 Paul Ménudier, 1931–1934
 Gabriel Lambert, 1934–1941
 Gaëtan Lévêque, 1941–1942
 Jules Gasser, 1943–1945
 Casimir, 1945–1947
 Nicolas Zannettacci, 1947–1948
 Jules Abadie, 1948
 , 1948–1962

President of city delegation, 1962–67 
 Abdessamad Benabdellah, 1962–1963
 , 1963–1965
 Hadj Brahim Tayeb Mokhtar Al Mahaji, 1965
 Seghier Ben Ali, 1965–1967

President of People's Municipal Assembly, 1967–92
 Seghier Ben Ali, 1967–1975
 Briki Abdelkader, 1975–1979
 Seghier Djillali, 1979–1980
 Benamar Lahouari, 1980–1983
 Benkoula Tayeb, 1983–1984
 Arif Kaddour, 1984–1988
 Tounsi Abdelkader, 1988–1990
 Bouslah Boualem, 1990–1992

President of the Délégation exécutive communale, 1992–97
 Henni Merouane, 1992–1995
 Habib Benguenane, 1995–1997

President of People's Municipal Assembly, since 1997
 Zitouni Tayeb, 1997–2002
 Djellouli Noureddine, 2002–2003
 Boukhatem Noureddine, 2004–2007
 , 2007–2010
 Hassam Zinedine, 2010–2012
 Boukhatem Noureddine, 2012–2017

See also
 List of governors of Oran, 1509–1831 (Spanish and Ottoman periods)
 Timeline of Oran

References

This article incorporates information from the French Wikipedia.

 mayors
Oran
oran
Oran